Kappeln is a town in the district of Schleswig-Flensburg, in Schleswig-Holstein, Germany. For the eastern Angeln and the northern Schwansen,  Kappeln has center function.

History 
Kappeln was first mentioned in records in 1357. In 1870 Kappeln received town privileges, after it was a Flecken. A Flecken was a market town in Schleswig.

Twin towns – sister cities

Kappeln is twinned with:
 Faaborg-Midtfyn, Denmark (1984)
 Ustka, Poland (1991)
 Merate, Italy (2007)

Notable people
Jacob Moser (1839–1922), entrepreneur, Zionist and philanthropist
Friedrich Koch (1859–1947), church painter

References

External links 

 

Towns in Schleswig-Holstein
Populated coastal places in Germany (Baltic Sea)
Schleswig-Flensburg